Olenivka is the name of several localities in Ukraine:

Urban-type settlements
Olenivka, Volnovakha Raion, urban-type settlement in Volnovakha Raion, Donetsk Oblast
Olenivka, Horlivka Raion, urban-type settlement in Horlivka Raion, Donetsk Oblast

Villages
Olenivka, Podilsk Raion, village in Podilsk Raion, Odessa Oblast

Events

Olenivka prison explosion, explosion at a Russian-operated prison on 29 July, 2022

See also
Yelenovka (disambiguation)